José González Granero (born February 11, 1985 in Iznatoraf, Jaén, Spain) is a Spanish musician and since 2010, the Principal Clarinetist for the San Francisco Opera.

Early life 
José González Granero was born in a family of musicians. His father, Pedro González, is the director of the local music band in Iznatoraf. When José was only 6 years old, his father taught him to play the Caja, which is similar to a Snare Drum. Then he learned to play the Saxophone at the Conservatorio Elemental de Música de Cazorla. Later on, he also learned to play the Clarinet and the Piano at the Conservatorio Profesional de Música de Jaén. José eventually chose the Clarinet as his Career instrument.

Musical Composition 
In 2003, José composed an Overture titled Overture for a Celebration with a level of Difficulty 4. His Composition won the second prize at the city of Comines-Warneton in Belgium and his Original Work has been published in Italy by  Scomegna Edizioni Musicali .

Early career 
After his successful participation in Belgium, José earned a Scholarship and became an official Erasmus student of the Milan Conservatory in Italy during the 2004 Academic Course.

In 2005, he participated in the L'Orchestre des Jeunes de la Méditerraneé

In July 2006, he received the Ex Aequo Scholarship by the City of Granada Orchestra where he earned a Bachelor of Arts and took private lessons with seasoned Classical Music professional mentors.

Musical Studies in California 
In 2008, José then moved to California to complete a Graduate Studies program at the University of Southern California and also at The Colburn School of the Performing Arts in the  City of Pasadena in order to continue his Clarinet studies with the clarinetist, Yehuda Gilad.

Awards 
2nd Prize with the Overture for a Celebration Awarded at the City of Comines-Warneton, in Belgium (2003).
Grand Prize for Exceptional Talent and Musicianship in Pasadena (2008).
1st Prize Burbank Philharmonic Orchestra Competition (2009).
2nd Prize Downey Symphony Orchestra Competition (2009).
Bruce Zalkind Memorial Endowed Music Award (2009).

Pasadena Showcase House of Arts Grand Prize 
After winning the 24th annual Pasadena Showcase House of the Arts Grand Prize in 2008, José kept performing and got an invitation to audition for the principal Clarinet position at the San Francisco Opera.

San Francisco Opera Audition 
The San Francisco Opera invited over 249 talented clarinetists in the United States to audition for the Principal Clarinet position at the prestigious orchestra. Behind a curtain, the director, Nicola Luisotti and a panel of experts, listened to over 129 finalist candidates and based only in the sound and consistency of their performance, they eventually chose José to be the principal Clarinetist.

Tenure 
After a successful Opera Season 2011, José has been offered the Principal Clarinet Tenure position on 12 October 2011, which is a privilege for any professional musician. Besides his participation with the Opera Orchestra, he has also been invited to perform in guest appearances with the San Francisco Ballet and the EOS Ensemble chamber music orchestra.

References 

 Old First Concerts Jose Gonzalez Granero Biography
 The Opera Tattler Panel discussion with Maestro Donald Runnicles
 Oficina Cultura-Juventud Villarzobispo
 Overture for a Celebration Scomegna Edizioni Musicali Sheet Music/Scores
 José González Granero, Sa Biographie Les oeuvres de José González GRANERO
 2008 Pasadena Showcase House Instrumental Competition Winner

External links
San Francisco Opera
Pasadena Showcase House Award
Clariperu Blog

1985 births
Living people
People from the Province of Jaén (Spain)
Spanish clarinetists
21st-century clarinetists